The Associated Students of the University of California (ASUC) is the autonomous and officially recognized students' association of the University of California, Berkeley. It is the only students' association within the University of California that is fully autonomous from the university administration. Founded in 1887, the ASUC is an independent, 501(c)(3) non-profit, and unincorporated association. The ASUC controls funding for all ASUC-sponsored organizations, advocates on behalf of students to solve issues on campus and in the community, engages with administrators to develop programming, increase student-organizational resources, and increase transparency.

History
The ASUC was founded on March 2, 1887. Prior to this, Berkeley had no residence halls, sport teams, or permanent student organizations. The original purpose of the ASUC was "to organize the Student Body in such wise that it might take effective action upon all matter relating to the general welfare of the student body and the University in general." The organization went on to absorb the Cal Student Store, become the center of student organization oversight, and run all university athletics until the 1960s.

Various student political parties – popularly known as "slates" – and independent student communities participate in the ASUC. SLATE, a pioneer organization of the New Left and precursor of the Free Speech Movement and formative counterculture era, was a campus political party at Cal from 1958 to 1966, while VOICE (a radical party) and Pact (a liberal party) were campus political parties at Cal in 1967.

At present, two parties primarily dominate ASUC politics. Student Action, founded 1995, is a coalition of organizations, with key support groups being the Greek life and pre-law community. CalSERVE (Cal Students for Equal Rights and a Valid Education), founded 1984, is also a coalition, but one centered directly on "access, representation, and social, environmental, and racial justice."

The history of ASUC political parties includes large and small parties advocating for a multitude of interests. SQUELCH! is a satirical party which has run and won seats in the past before suffering a major blow in the 2017 elections, when they won no seats in the senate. The Pirate Party centers their messaging on technology and humor, campaigning in pirate costumes during election season. As of the 2017 elections, they held one seat in the ASUC Senate. The Defend Affirmative Action Party (DAAP), founded by national activist and left-wing militant group BAMN, campaigns on a platform of radical racial justice and inclusion for students, though has found relatively little support, having won no seats for 9 years . BAMN itself began at Berkeley in 1995 and ran candidates starting in 1996 under its own name, which, at the time, was The Coalition to Defend Affirmative Action By Any Means Necessary. The major parties from the late 1980s and early 1990s included: the Bears Party, drawing from a similar constituency as today's Student Action; Students for Progress, a center-left party; as well as Cal-SERVE. Minor Parties that won seats during that era included: More centrist groups like GRASP (Grass Root and Student Power), APPLE (A People's Party for Loyalty and Experience), Vision, SEED, a progressive party to the left of Cal-SERVE; Crusaders for the Rights of Undeclared and Confused Students (CRUCS), focused on initiatives to improve student life such as extending the P/NP and drop deadlines beyond the first round of midterms; the Monster Truck Party, appealing to Greek constituencies with the slogan: "what will knowledge of other cultures do if your car throws a rod 10 miles outside of Kettleman City"; the PENIS Party, with the slogan "erect a leader," and a platform advocating for more urinals and a taller Campanile; and the Science and Engineering Party, which advocated for the interests of science and engineering students and who partnered with CRUCS to win 4 executive seats between 1990 and 1992.

Programs and resources 
The ASUC's responsibilities include allocating student group funding through a yearly spring budgeting process. The finance officer evaluates each club's funding request, length of time as a sponsored organization, and history of funding in order to determine how much money each registered student organization should be allocated. The ASUC budgets in excess of $1 million each year to campus organizations, including the Bridges multicultural resource & retention center.

The offices of the president and the external affairs vice president focus much of their time on student advocacy, often relating to issues of sexual assault, campus safety, student voice, mental health, equality, and diversity.

Governance 
The ASUC Constitution establishes a students' association with elected officials modeled after California's separation-of-powers and plural elected executive framework.

The executive officers and the Senate of the ASUC are popularly elected by single transferable vote. Chief Appointed Officers are non-partisan officials appointed by the Senate. The six Chief Appointed Officials are the Chief Financial Officer (CFO), Chief Legal Officer (CLO), Chief Communications Officer (CCO), Chief Technology Officer (CTO), Chief Personnel Officer (CPO), and Chief Grants & Scholarships Officer (CGO).

The five elected executive officers of the ASUC are the President, Executive Vice President (EVP), External Affairs Vice President (EAVP), Academic Affairs Vice President (AAVP), and the Student Advocate. Political parties that compete in ASUC elections usually run candidates for the first four positions, while the fifth, student advocate, is traditionally won in a nonpartisan race by a member of the staff of the outgoing student advocate.

In 2019, the student body passed the Transfer Remedy Act ballot proposition, which added the Transfer Student Representative as a unique ASUC office intended to represent the campus' growing transfer student population. The Transfer Student Representative is a voting ex-officio member of the ASUC Senate, serving as the de facto twenty-first member of the Senate and maintaining all of the responsibilities of a regular ASUC Senator. The Transfer Student Representative is chosen a separate election using the single transferable vote mechanism. The position was on the ASUC election ballot for the first time in the spring 2020 election.

Notable alumni 
 Jesse Gabriel, member of the California State Assembly from the 45th district.
 Christopher Cabaldon, Mayor of West Sacramento, California.
 Jesse Arreguín, 22nd Mayor of Berkeley.
 Josh Fryday, former Mayor of Novato, California and Chief Service Officer, State of California.
 Nick Pacheco, member of the Los Angeles City Council from the 14th district (1999-2003).
 José Huizar, member of the Los Angeles City Council from the 14th district (2005-2020).
 Rigel Robinson, member of the Berkeley, California City Council.
 Pedro Noguera, Dean, USC Rossier School of Education.
 Wally Adeyemo, Deputy Secretary of the Treasury; inaugural president of the Obama Foundation.
 Leigh Steinberg, American sports agent.
 Ki Hong Lee, American actor.

List of executive officers

See also 
 Associated Students of the University of California, Santa Barbara
 Student governments in the United States
 University of California Student Association

References

External links
 
 Student Advocate's Office website
 History of the Berkeley Student Government at the UC Berkeley Library's UC History Digital Archives
 CalSERVE website
 Student Action website
 
 SDU website

University of California, Berkeley
Student governments in the United States
Student organizations in California
Student organizations established in 1887
1887 establishments in California
501(c)(3) organizations
Organizations based in Berkeley, California
Non-profit organizations based in the San Francisco Bay Area